William Price (died 1596), of Bath, Somerset, was an English politician.

He was a Member (MP) of the Parliament of England for Bath in 1593.

References

Year of birth missing
1596 deaths
People from Bath, Somerset
English MPs 1593